Tory Woodbury (born July 12, 1978) is a former American football quarterback and wide receiver and current Tight Ends and Special Teams coach for the St. Louis BattleHawks He was originally signed as an undrafted free agent out of Winston-Salem State University by the New York Jets.

College career
Woodbury threw for a school record 4,536 passing yards with 40 touchdowns and also rushed for 1,020 yards and 20 touchdowns during his career at WSSU.  His 60 combined touchdowns also tied a school record.

Professional career
Woodbury was signed by the New York Jets as an undrafted free agent. He was considered a sleeper in the draft by analysts Mel Kiper Jr. He played as quarterback and wide receiver for the Jets but then was released. He was signed by the Buffalo Bills for the 2006 season but was released afterwards.

Coaching career
Woodbury became an assistant coach with the Los Angeles Rams in 2020, after three years of being a scout within the organization.

References

1978 births
African-American players of American football
American football quarterbacks
American football wide receivers
Living people
New York Jets players
New Orleans Saints players
Buffalo Bills players
Cologne Centurions (NFL Europe) players
Winston-Salem State Rams football players
New Orleans VooDoo players
Los Angeles Rams coaches
African-American coaches of American football
21st-century African-American sportspeople
20th-century African-American sportspeople
Players of American football from Winston-Salem, North Carolina